Rashmi Sinha is an Indian businesswoman and CEO of San Francisco-based technology company SlideShare. In 2012, Fortune named her No. 8 on its Most Powerful Women Entrepreneurs list. In 2008, Rashmi was named one of the World's Top 10 Women Influencers in Web 2.0 by Fast Company. In January 2015, The Economic Times listed her as one of 20 "most influential" global Indian women.

Early life and education 
Rashmi Sinha was born in Lucknow, India, grew up in India, and earned a PhD in cognitive neuropsychology at Brown University. There, Rashmi took computer science courses with Andy van Dam, so she had some exposure to the HCI (human-computer interaction) way of thinking. She took a course in designing educational software. Rashmi Sinha went to University of California, Berkeley for a postdoc where she switched her focus to human-computer interaction.

She also earned an M.A. and a B.A. in Psychology from Allahabad University.

Business career 
She then left academia at the University of California to start her own user-experience consultancy. Deciding that she enjoyed practical problems more, she co-founded Uzanto, a user experience consulting company and worked on projects for companies like eBay, Blue Shield, AAA etc. Her first foray into products was with MindCanvas (a game-like software for customer research) released in November 2005.

Simultaneously, Rashmi and her husband, with the help of her older brother Amit Ranjan, built SlideShare, a site for people to share presentations online, in just six months. Since its launch in 2006, more than 9 million presentations have been uploaded to SlideShare, helping professionals connect through content. LinkedIn acquired SlideShare for over $100 million in 2012.

Personal life 
Sinha is married to Jonathan Boutelle, who is the co-founder and Chief technology officer of SlideShare. They live in San Francisco.

In 2008, Rashmi was named one of the World's Top 10 Women Influencers in Web 2.0 by Fast Company.

Management philosophy 
Rashmi writes about social software and entrepreneurship at her blog; Rashmisinha.com. She is involved in the HCI community, was one of the founding members of the Information Architecture Society, and co-chairs the monthly BayCHI talk series.

See also 
 List of Indian Americans

References

External links 

 SlideShare
 Rashmi's Blog
 Rashmi's Interview
 Rashmi Sinha

Indian emigrants to the United States
Brown University alumni
University of California, Berkeley alumni
Businesspeople from San Francisco
Living people
American people of Indian descent
American women of Indian descent in health professions
LinkedIn people
Businesspeople from Lucknow
Businesswomen from Uttar Pradesh
Year of birth missing (living people)
21st-century American women